The 2009 Tour of Qatar was held from 1 February to 6 February 2009 in Qatar. The Race was won by Tom Boonen of the Quick Step team.

During the night after stage 4 Belgian cyclist Frederiek Nolf of the Topsport Vlaanderen–Mercator team died in his sleep  of a suspected heart attack. The organisers cancelled stage 5 and held a 'cycling procession' instead.

Stage summary

Other leading top threes

Men's top 10 overall

References
 Official site
 Cyclingnews.com 2009 Tour of Qatar

Tour of Qatar
Tour of Qatar
Tour of Qatar